Bruce Gibbs is an Australian former rugby league footballer who played in the 1970s and 1980s from Oberon, New South Wales. He first played for Workington Town in England between 1975 and 1976. That year he also played for the Other Nationalities side. He then moved to Australia where he played for his first Australian club, Newtown, in 1977, playing twelve games and scoring two tries. He then signed for Western Suburbs and played at the club between 1978 and 1980 where he formed a front row partnership with John Donnelly. He made a total of 49 appearances for the club, scoring four tries.

References

Books

External links
Statistics at rugbyleagueproject.org
Statistics at stats.rleague.com

Living people
Australian rugby league players
Newtown Jets players
Other Nationalities rugby league team players
Rugby league players from New South Wales
Rugby league props
Year of birth missing (living people)
Place of birth missing (living people)
Western Suburbs Magpies players
Workington Town players